Tank Girl is a British comic book character created by Alan Martin and Jamie Hewlett, and first appeared in print in 1988 in the British comics magazine Deadline. After a period of intense popularity in the late 1980s and early 1990s, Tank Girl inspired a 1995 feature film. After a long hiatus, the character returned to comics in 2007 and has appeared regularly in the years since. 

Originally written by Martin and drawn by Hewlett, the character has also been drawn by Philip Bond, Glyn Dillon, Ashley Wood, Warwick Johnson-Cadwell, Jim Mahfood, Brett Parson, Jonathan Edwards, Craig Knowles, Rufus Dayglo, Andy Pritchett, and Mike McMahon.

Tank Girl (Rebecca Buck – later revealed to have been born as Fonzie Rebecca Buckler) drives a tank, which is also her home. She undertakes a series of missions for a nebulous organization before making a serious mistake and being declared an outlaw for her sexual inclinations and her substance abuse. The comic centres on her misadventures with her boyfriend, Booga, a mutant kangaroo. The comic's irreverent style is heavily influenced by punk visual art, and strips are frequently deeply disorganized, anarchic, absurdist, and psychedelic. The strip features various elements with origins in surrealist techniques, fanzines, collage, cut-up technique, stream of consciousness, and metafiction, with very little regard or interest for conventional plot or committed narrative.

The strip was initially set in a futuristic Australia, although it drew heavily from contemporary British pop culture.

Publication history
Martin and Hewlett first met in the mid-1980s in Worthing, while studying at The West Sussex College of Art and Design (WSCD, later renamed Northbrook College). Martin was in the college band The University Smalls with fellow comics enthusiast Philip Bond. One of their songs was called "Rocket Girl". They had started adding the suffix 'girl' to everything habitually after the release of the Supergirl movie, but "Rocket Girl" was a student at college on whom Bond had a crush and who apparently bore a striking resemblance to a Love and Rockets character. Martin and Hewlett began collaborating on a comic/fanzine called Atomtan, and while working on this, Hewlett had drawn:
  

The image was published in the fanzine as a one-page ad, but the Tank Girl series first appeared in the debut issue of Deadline (1988), a UK magazine intended as a forum for new comic talent, and it continued until the end of the magazine in 1995.

Tank Girl became quite popular in the politicized indie counterculture zeitgeist as a cartoon mirror of the growing empowerment of women in punk rock culture. Posters, shirts, and underpants began springing up everywhere, including one especially made for the Clause 28 march against Margaret Thatcher's legislation. Clause 28 stated that a local authority "shall not intentionally promote homosexuality or publish material with the intention of promoting homosexuality" or "promote the teaching in any maintained school of the acceptability of homosexuality as a pretended family relationship." Deadline publisher Tom Astor said, "In London, there are even weekly lesbian gatherings called 'Tank Girl nights.'"

With public interest growing, Penguin, the largest publishing company in Britain, bought the rights to collect the strips as a book, and before long, Tank Girl had been published in Spain, Italy, Germany, Scandinavia, Argentina, Brazil and Japan, with several United States publishers fighting over the licence.  Finally Dark Horse Comics won, and the strips were reprinted beginning in 1991, with an extended break in '92, and ending in September '93. A graphic novel-length story named Tank Girl: The Odyssey was also published in 1995 (released in four issues by Vertigo Comics), written by Peter Milligan and loosely inspired by Homer's Odyssey, Joyce's Ulysses, and a considerable quantity of junk TV. This was followed by another four issue series, Tank Girl: Apocalypse, written by Alan Grant and published by Vertigo from November 1995 to February 1996.

Tank Girl after 1996 
After the 1995 film, Hewlett went on to create the band Gorillaz with Blur's Damon Albarn. Martin has also played in various bands, and written various screenplays and scripts.

After a long publishing hiatus, the character returned in 2007 in Tank Girl: The Gifting, a four-issue limited series written by Martin and illustrated by Australian artist Ashley Wood, which was published by IDW Publishing. This was the first new Tank Girl comic material since the final two issues of the four issue series Tank Girl: Apocalypse in 1996. The four-issue limited series Tank Girl: Visions of Booga, by Martin and artist Rufus Dayglo, was released in 2008 by IDW, as was Tank Girl: Armadillo and a Bushel of Other Stories, a Tank Girl novel authored by Martin and published by Titan Books.

Since then, Tank Girl has appeared on a regular basis in various one-shots and limited series, published by IDW, Image Comics, and Titan Comics. The regular creative team is Alan Martin and Brett Parson.

Titan Books released The Hole of Tank Girl on 28 September 2012, which encompasses the original Hewlett and Martin material, as well as additional content.

The three-issue limited series 21st Century Tank Girl debuted on 10 June 2015.

Martin and artist Warwick Johnson-Cadwell have also created a kid-friendly spin-off called Young Tank Girl, published in the digital anthology Moose Kid Comics.

In 2019, Titan Comics debuted Tank Girl, publicized as Tank Girl's first ongoing series,  with an indicia listing the book as Tank Girl Ongoing. From January to May 2019, the first four issues were cover-titled Tank Girl: Action Alley, and from July to December 2019, the next four issues were cover-titled Tank Girl Forever.

Characters
 Tank Girl:  Her real name in the strip is Rebecca Buck, but this is very rarely mentioned. In the Kickstarter edition of 21st Century Tank Girl, it is discovered that she was actually born under the name Fonzie Rebecca Buckler. According to her own history included as a preface to one of the books, her first words were "cauliflower penis".  When she was 7, she started a collection of novelty pencil sharpeners (the collection is now housed in the National Museum of Modern Pencil Sharpeners, Sydney). She later became a tank driver and worked as a bounty hunter before shooting a heavily decorated officer, having mistaken him for her father, and failing to deliver colostomy bags to President Hogan, the incontinent Head of State in Australia, resulting in him publicly embarrassing himself at a large international trade conference. These events resulted in Tank Girl becoming an outlaw with a multi-million dollar bounty on her head. She is prone to random acts of sex and violence, hair dyeing, flatulence, nose-picking, vomiting, spitting, and more than occasional drunkenness.  She also has the ability to outrun any ice cream van – even Mr. Whippy. Tank Girl typically wears cut-off T-shirts or simply a bra, along with shorts and plenty of earrings and necklaces. Her natural hair color appears to be blonde, though she has appeared in many different hairstyles. 
 Booga: A mutated kangaroo, formerly a successful toy designer of "products Santa would've sacrificed a reindeer for," and presently Tank Girl's devoted boyfriend. She met him when he sneaked into her tank one night to pinch a pair of her knickers.  He is a big Dame Edna fan and once impersonated Bill Clinton. Booga, often against his will, always does the cooking, particularly the great British institution of tea. He follows Tank Girl everywhere and does, by his own admission, whatever she tells him. This includes murder.
 The talking stuffed animals:
Camp Koala: A stitchy, brown, gay, koala-shaped stuffed toy described as "the Jeremy Thorpe of comics", whom TG sodomizes with a hot banana. Camp Koala died tragically when they were playing baseball with live hand grenades which Camp eagerly caught in the outfield, exploding on impact, resulting in a violent, bloody, and gruesome death.  After a tearless and comical funeral service, the other characters go to a toy store and buy a new one. Camp Koala is known for visiting occasionally as a guardian angel.  He is the only character TG has ever admitted to loving.
Squeaky toy rat: A squeaky toy rat.
Mr. Precocious: A "small Shakespearean mutant" who looks a bit like a mini bipedal pink elephant, though may possibly be a bilby.
 Stevie: A wild-haired blond Aboriginal man who owns a convenience store and chain-smokes. Since he is TG's ex-boyfriend, Booga is always a bit jealous of him.  He has various familial ties and connections with Aboriginal culture and remote traditionalist tribespeople.
 Barney: Busted out of a mental hospital by TG, she is more or less insane. In The Odyssey, she is responsible for killing the whole cast, thereby sending them all to the land of the dead, from which TG was forced to save them by finding the Prince of Farts.
 Sub Girl (real name unknown, although a trading card for the film once listed her real name as 'Subrina'): Described as "like a beautiful flower floating in the loo", she pilots a submarine. A friend of TG's since childhood, she used to come round her house with Jet Girl and try on her mum's underwear.
 Jet Girl (real name unknown): A talented mechanic who flies a jet. All her friends call her "boring" (she has admitted to being a big fan of Rod Stewart).

Collected editions
Tank Girl has been collected into a number of trade paperbacks over the years. The entire back catalogue was reprinted by Titan Books in 2002 and these books were "re-mastered" in anniversary editions, stripped of their subsequently-added computer colouring and line work repaired. In 2018 the entire Hewlett and Martin back catalogue was once again reprinted under the "Tank Girl Colour Classics" banner, this time as collectible hardbacks, with all-new colouring and extra material.

Film

The comic was also adapted into a critically and financially unsuccessful film, albeit with a small cult following. The film featured Lori Petty as Tank Girl and Naomi Watts as Jet Girl. Martin and Hewlett are known for speaking poorly of the experience, with Martin calling it "a bit of a sore point" for them. 

In September 2019, a Tank Girl reboot movie was reported to be in development with Margot Robbie's production company LuckyChap Entertainment optioned rights from MGM, Robbie co-produce with her partners Tom Ackerley and Josey McNamara, Mallory Westfall writing and Miles Joris-Peyrafitte directing.

See also
 Action Girl Comics
 The Invisibles
 Kill Your Boyfriend
 Lesbian pulp fiction
 Portrayal of women in comics
 Riot Grrrl

References

External links

 
 Tank Girl at Don Markstein's Toonopedia. Archived from the original on September 29, 2015.
 The Nao Of Brown  – Glyn Dillon (Jamie Hewlett collaborator) blog
 Philip Bond – Tank Girl collaborator and artist

Interviews
 Suicide Girls Interview – With Alan Martin about the Tank Girl relaunch
 Alan Martin interview  – about the 2007 relaunch from IDW comics.
 Jamie Hewlett interview about influences

1988 comics debuts
Anarchist comics
Bisexuality-related fiction
British comics titles
Female characters in comics
Comics about women
British comics adapted into films
Dark Horse Comics characters
Dark Horse Comics titles
Feminist comics
Comics characters introduced in 1988
Feminist science fiction
Fictional bisexual females
Fictional outlaws
IDW Publishing titles
Post-apocalyptic comics
Punk comics
Vertigo Comics titles
Comics set in Australia
Fictional Australian people
Sexuality in fiction

ja:タンク・ガール